George Douglas Liddell Sommerville (21 December 1900 – 1984) was a Scottish professional footballer who played as a goalkeeper.

He worked as an aircraft inspector during the Second World War. His sister Isa married John Steel, a teammate at Hamilton and Burnley.

References

Footballers from Motherwell
Scottish footballers
Association football goalkeepers
Hamilton Academical F.C. players
Scottish Football League players
Scottish Junior Football Association players
Burnley F.C. players
Strathclyde F.C. players
Bristol City F.C. players
Burton Town F.C. players
Yeovil Town F.C. players
English Football League players
1900 births
1984 deaths
Date of death missing